The 1965 International 6 Hour Touring Car Race was a six-hour endurance race for touring cars held at the Sandown Park circuit in Victoria, Australia on 21 November 1965. The race, which was open to cars classified in Group 1 of international Appendix J, was the second in a sequence of races which would evolve into the Sandown 500. The race was won by Frank Gardner and  Kevin Bartlett driving an Alfa Romeo TI Super entered by Alec Mildren Racing.

Classes
Cars competed in five classes according to engine capacity.
Class A : Over 3000cc
Class B : 2001–3000cc
Class C : 1501–2000cc
Class D : 1101–1500cc
Class E : Up to 1100cc

Results

39 cars started the race and 29 finished. Names of drivers who were entered in the car but did not drive during the race are shown within brackets.

Awards
 1st automatic to finish – Car No 7  – Bill Burns & B Lawler (Jaguar 3.8 Automatic)
 1st Woman's Team to finish – Car No 65 – Dianne Leighton & Kaye Whiteford (Vauxhall Viva)
 1st Nominated Team – Cars 48 & 50 – Bob Holden & Ron Haylen (Morris Cooper S) and William Stanley & Digby Cooke (Morris Cooper S)

References

Further reading
 Alfa wins through again at dull Six hours at Sandown, Australian Motor Manual, February 1966, pages 48 & 49
 David McKay, Six Long, Long Hours at Sandown!, Modern Motor, February 1966, pages 73 to 75
 Romsey Quints, Six Hour (Al)fandango, Wheels (magazine), February 1966, pages 48 to 51

Motorsport at Sandown
International 6 Hour Touring Car Race